Seferler is a village in the District of Çine, Aydın Province, Turkey. As of the 2010 Turkish Census, it had a population of 802 people.

References

Villages in Çine District